Nam Sang-mi (born May 3, 1984) is a South Korean actress.

Career 
Nam Sang-mi was working in a Lotteria restaurant near Hanyang University in the fall of 2001 when someone posted her personal photos on the internet. Her popularity as an ulzzang led to her discovery as an actress. She made her debut in the 2003 melodrama series Love Letter, and began her acting career by taking small roles in films, TV dramas, and commercials. Her first leading role came with Sweet Spy in 2005. This was followed by leading roles in comedy drama Bad Family (2006) and action romance drama Time Between Dog and Wolf (2007).

In 2008, Nam starred as an aspiring food columnist in Gourmet, a hit series based on Huh Young-man's manhwa Sikgaek.

Nam said regarding her role in horror film Possessed (2009), "The moment I read the script, I wanted this part badly. After such a long time away from films, it excited me, and I can show a completely different side than I've shown in dramas." She next played the titular character in romantic comedy drama Invincible Lee Pyung Kang.

After starring in close friend Ku Hye-sun's short film You (2010), Ku cast her as the leading lady of her second feature film The Peach Tree (2012). Meanwhile, on the small screen, Nam starred in the retro music drama Lights and Shadows (2011) and romantic comedy drama Goddess of Marriage (2013).

In 2014, Nam reunited with Time Between Dog and Wolf costar Lee Joon-gi in the period drama Gunman in Joseon. This was followed by a starring role in the comedy film Slow Video.

In 2017, Nam starred in the office comedy drama Good Manager. In 2018, Nam starred in the mystery thriller series Let Me Introduce Her.

Personal life
Nam married a businessman at a small church in Yangpyeong County, Gyeonggi Province on January 24, 2015. She gave birth to a baby girl on the afternoon of November 12, 2015.

Filmography

Film

Television series

Variety show

Music video

Awards and nominations

References

External links 
 Nam Sang-mi at Yeuleum Entertainment 
  
 

South Korean television actresses
South Korean film actresses
1984 births
Living people
L&Holdings artists
People from Yeongju